Avedøre is a south-western suburb of Copenhagen located in Hvidovre Municipality.

Description
The city is mostly made up of concrete blocks and row-housing, but some people residing in Avedøre live in detached single-family houses with gardens. One major high-rise block called "Store Hus" (lit. English: Grand House) dominates the suburb's skyline. The city has a relatively high rate of crime and many inhabitants are unemployed . Approximately 16,000 persons live in Avedøre, and approx. 60% of the inhabitants is either immigrant or born by immigrants, mainly from Iraq, Palestine, Lebanon, Spain  and Turkey.

History
Prior to 1 April 1974, Avedøre was an exclave of Glostrup Municipality. On that date, Avedøre was combined with neighboring Hvidovre Municipality.

Transportation
From the Avedøre railway station, the S-train line A runs to Copenhagen city center. Arriving at Copenhagen Central Station takes approximately 15 minutes with the A line train from Avedøre.

Notable people 
 Majid (born 1975) a Danish rapper of Moroccan-Berber origin, from Brøndby Strand, lives in Avedøre

Sources 

Copenhagen metropolitan area
Hvidovre Municipality